El Jadida Province (in Arabic: الجديدة) is a province of Morocco, located in the region of Casablanca-Settat. The province takes its name from the chief city of El Jadida. Its population in 2006 was 1,128,098.

History 
The El Jadida province was created on 10 July 1967.

Demography

Subdivisions
The province is divided administratively into the following:

Tourism
The area of El Jadida has 150 km of coast and several beaches are tourist destinations, the most famous being Sidi Bouzid.

The most famous beaches are:

 Deauville (In the centre of El Jadida)
 Al Haouzia (2 km in north)
 Sidi Bouzid (3 km in the south)

Sidi Bouzid is a seaside resort, bordering El Jadida. It attracts thousands of holiday makers each year.

References

Sources 
Province of El Jadida on the site of World Gazetter, by Stefan Helders

 
El Jadida